5/1 may refer to:
May 1 (month-day date notation)
January 5 (day-month date notation)
 A form of quintuple meter